Semiha Yankı (born 15 January 1958) is a Turkish pop music singer, presenter and film actress, best known for representing Turkey for the first time at the Eurovision Song Contest 1975 with the song Seninle Bir Dakika.

Discography
 Büyük Aşkımız (Our Great Love)
 Adını Yollara Yazdım (Disco-1989)
 Ben Sana Mecburum (I'm compelled to you)
 Sevgi Üstüne (About Love)
 Hayırlı Olsun (Good luck with it)
 Ayrılanlar İçin
 Seni Seviyorum (I love you) (Ağdaş Müzik-2004)

Filmography
 Güneş Doğmasın (1961)
 Hammal (1976)

References
 Sinematürk – Brief information on Semiha Yankı 
 Who is Who Database – Biography of Semiha Yankı

External links
 

1958 births
Living people
Eurovision Song Contest entrants of 1975
Singers from Istanbul
Turkish film actresses
Eurovision Song Contest entrants for Turkey
Turkish women singers
Turkish pop singers
Turkish mezzo-sopranos